Melun is a commune in the arrondissement of Melun in north-central France.

Melun may also refer to:
Anne Julie de Melun (1698-1724), French noblewoman and mother of the general Charles de Rohan and Madame de Marsan, governess of Louis XVI
Guillaume IV de Melun (died 1415), Count of Tancarville, Lord of Montreuil-Bellay, French politician, chamberlain and advisor to King Charles VI of France
Judah of Melun, 13th century Jewish rabbi 
Louis, Duke of Joyeuse (1694–1724) (Louis de Melun), French nobleman
Robert de Melun (died 1585), nobleman from the Low Countries
Robert of Melun (c. 1100-1167), English theologian and Bishop of Hereford
Simon de Melun (1250-1302), Marshal of France

See also
Melun Diptych, by the 15th-century French painter Jean Fouquet
Treaty of Melun, April 1226, between Louis VIII of France and Jeanne of Constantinople
Melun Act of 1851, one of the first laws regarding public health